George Lichtheim (Berlin; 1912 – 1973; London) was a German-born intellectual whose works focused on the history and theory of socialism and Marxism.

The son of the scholar and Zionist activist Richard Lichtheim, he defined himself as a socialist and stated in a 1964 letter to The New York Review of Books that "I am not a liberal and never have been. I find liberalism almost as boring as communism and have no wish to be drawn into an argument over which of these two antiquated creeds is less likely to advance us any further."

His work appeared in the Palestine Post, Commentary, Partisan Review, Dissent, the New Leader, Encounter, the Times Literary Supplement and The New York Review of Books. He also translated Gershom Scholem's Major Trends in Jewish Mysticism.

He committed suicide in Hampstead in 1973.

His sister was the Egyptologist Miriam Lichtheim.

Selected works 
 The Pattern of World Conflict (1955)
 Marxism (1961)
 Marxism: An Historical and Critical Study (1964)
 Marxism in Modern France (1966)
 The Concept of Ideology, And Other Essays (1967)
 The Origins of Socialism (1969)
 A Short History of Socialism (1970) 
 Lukács (Fontana Modern Masters, 1970) 
 Imperialism (1971)  
 From Marx to Hegel (1971)
 Europe in the Twentieth Century (1972)
 Thoughts Among the Ruins: Collected essays on Europe and beyond (1973)

References 
 "The Other George: Lichtheim on Imperialism". Dissent.
 "A Reply by George Lichtheim". The New York Review of Books.
 "George Lichtheim's Marxmanship". Jewish Review of Books.

External links 
 "A French View of Israel" (PDF).

German socialists
Jewish German writers
American people of German-Jewish descent
1912 births
1973 suicides
20th-century German male writers
1973 deaths
German emigrants to the United States
Suicides in Hampstead
Jewish socialists

Historians of socialism
Jewish historians
Writers from Berlin